= Tree Energy Solutions =

Green energy company

Tree Energy Solutions (TES) is a European energy company developing infrastructure and synthetic fuels based on green hydrogen and captured carbon dioxide, with a focus on producing synthetic methane, also referred to as electric natural gas (e-NG).

The company has been profiled in international media for its strategy of using existing natural-gas infrastructure to distribute hydrogen-derived fuels, positioning itself at the intersection of energy security and decarbonisationin Europe and North America.

TES has drawn attention for large-scale projects in Germany and Canada, as well as for its leadership by former gas-infrastructure executives seeking to adapt liquefied natural gas (LNG) supply chains to low-carbon fuels.

== History ==
Tree Energy Solutions was founded in 2019 by a group of energy-sector executives including Marcel van Poecke, Chairman of Energy at the Carlyle Group and chairman of AtlasInvest, Paul van Poecke who held senior executive positions at Petroplus Logistics, Petroplus , 4 Gas and HES International and Marco Alverà, former chief executive of Italy’s gas transmission operator Snam. The company emerged amid growing concern in Europe over dependence on imported fossil gas and the need to reconcile energy security with climate targets.

Following Russia’s invasion of Ukraine in 2022, TES became associated with Germany’s rapid expansion of LNG import capacity, particularly in the port city of Wilhelmshaven.

Early plans focused on temporary floating LNG terminals, with longer-term ambitions to convert the infrastructure to handle hydrogen-derived fuels.

== Business model and strategy ==
TES’s core strategy is based on producing synthetic methane by combining green hydrogen with captured carbon dioxide, creating a fuel that is chemically identical to fossil natural gas and can be transported through existing pipelines, LNG terminals, and storage facilities.

The company has argued that this approach allows hydrogen to be deployed at scale without requiring end-users to replace industrial equipment or heating systems.

In interviews and profiles, TES executives have described the company’s approach as a way to “ship sunlight” from regions with abundant renewable power to energy-importing markets, particularly Europe.

At the same time, the company’s strategy has been framed as a response to political pressure in Europe to diversify gas supply away from Russia while maintaining system reliability.

== Projects ==
=== Germany ===
TES has been closely associated with the development of LNG infrastructure at Wilhelmshaven, Germany’s only deep-water port. The site initially hosted floating LNG terminals commissioned after 2022 to address short-term supply risks.

TES has stated that these facilities are intended to be replaced over time by a permanent onshore terminal capable of handling both fossil LNG and hydrogen-derived synthetic gas.

The Wilhelmshaven project has been described in the New York Times as part of Germany’s broader effort to secure non-Russian gas supplies, with TES positioned as a developer seeking to integrate low-carbon fuels into the existing LNG value chain.

=== Canada ===
In 2023, TES announced plans to develop a multi-billion-dollar green hydrogen project in Québec, one of the largest such proposals in Canada at the time.

Reporting in the Financial Times and Reuters described the project as a response to generous North American tax incentives and abundant low-carbon electricity, with most of the hydrogen intended to be converted into synthetic natural gas.

The Québec project has been cited as an example of how industrial policy and subsidies are shaping the global hydrogen market, with TES comparing Canadian incentives favourably to European frameworks.

=== United States and other regions ===
TES has also been linked to proposed hydrogen-based fuel projects in the United States and the Middle East, often in collaboration with established energy companies.

These initiatives have been discussed in the context of global competition for clean-energy investment and the role of synthetic fuels in heavy industry and shipping.

=== Reception and analysis ===
TES's strategy has received mixed reactions from policymakers, analysts, and environmental groups.

Supporters argue that synthetic natural gas offers a pragmatic pathway to decarbonise existing gas systems, particularly for industries that are difficult to electrify, while enhancing energy security. Critics, however, have questioned whether synthetic methane can be produced at scale without significant efficiency losses or unintended climate impacts.

An FT Moral Money analysis highlighted concerns that methane-based alternatives could delay electrification and lock in gas infrastructure, even if emissions are lower than those of fossil fuels. Environmental organisations have also warned that methane leakage and the high cost of green hydrogen may undermine claims of climate neutrality.
